The 1914–15 Tennessee Volunteers basketball team represents the University of Tennessee during the 1914–15 NCAA men's basketball season. The head coach was Zora G. Clevenger coaching the team in his fourth season. The Volunteers team captain was Malcolm McSpadden.

Schedule

|-

References

Tennessee Volunteers basketball seasons
Tennessee
Tennessee Volunteers
Tennessee Volunteers